Nghĩa Lộ is a town in Yên Bái Province, in the north-east region of Vietnam. It is bordered by Văn Chấn District and Trạm Tấu District.

In 1951, the Viet Minh 312 Division fought French forces in the area as part of the First Indochina War.

As of 2020, the district had a population of 68,206. The district covers an area of 107.78 km2.

Administrative divisions
Nghĩa Lộ is divided into 14 commune-level sub-divisions, including 4 wards (Cầu Thia, Pú Trạng, Tân An, Trung Tâm) and 10 rural communes (Hạnh Sơn, Nghĩa An, Nghĩa Lộ, Nghĩa Lợi, Nghĩa Phúc, Phù Nham, Phúc Sơn, Sơn A, Thạch Lương, Thanh Lương).

References

Districts of Yên Bái province
Populated places in Yên Bái province
County-level towns in Vietnam
Yên Bái province